Frühlingsrauschen, Op. 32, No. 3 ('Rustle of Spring') is a solo piano piece written by the Norwegian composer Christian Sinding (1856–1941) in 1896. It is Sinding's most popular piece of music. It is written in Salon style as a piece meant for entertainment. It was very popular in the United States. 

Bearing the expression marking agitato, much of the piece is played with a rapid arpeggio in the right hand part, while the left hand carries the melody.  The work's title indicates that its sense of constant motion is symbolic of the excited restlessness of springtime. The score has some technically challenging sections, but is, for the most part, easier to play than it sounds, with most of the rapidity made up of simply arpeggiated passages. 

For its popularity and ability to impress, the piece is a common part of many pianists' repertoires.

The piece is in D-flat major, and several times shifts to related keys such as F minor and A-flat major, as well as modulating via chromatic harmonies to more remote keys like G minor and A major.  Its form may be summed up thus:

 (a) 16-bar main theme, starting in B-flat minor, passing through F minor, and ending in A-flat major (the dominant);
 (b) 14-bar extension to main theme, beginning in F minor, and further developing the theme, and moving via sequence through G minor and A major, before shifting suddenly back to D-flat major as a climax;
 (c) Varied repetition of (a);
 (d) Varied repetition of (b);
 (e) Near-exact repetition of (a) (except for first 4 bars, which are varied yet again);
 (f) Exact repetition of (b);
 (g) Coda, consisting of shortened version of (a) (varied in the same manner as (c)), this time staying in D-flat major instead of modulating, followed by a cadence based on this theme, and decorated by extensive scale and arpeggio passages.

It appears in the second episode of Dennis Potter's 1986 TV series The Singing Detective, and as a quoted version in a few parts of Meredith Willson's 1957 musical The Music Man.  It also appears very prominently in the 1939 Hollywood film Intermezzo, first in an orchestral arrangement, then its main melody is hummed by Ingrid Bergman and played on the piano by Bergman.

External links
 
 BBC Radio 4: Auditory Illusions (Clips)

Compositions by Christian Sinding
Compositions for solo piano
1896 compositions
Compositions in D-flat major